Kabir Panth (Path of Kabir) is a Sant Mat denomination and philosophy based on the teachings of Satguru Kabir Saaheb. It is based on devotion to him as one guru as a means to salvation. Its adherents are from many religious backgrounds as Kabir never advocated change of religions but highlighted their limitations. According to some scholars, this tradition belong to Vaishnavism with universalist leanings. In respect of Kabir, his followers celebrate Kabir Jayanti/Praakatya.

Practices and beliefs

Kabir Panthis  can follow the ethical and social customs of the day according to tradition without hindrance. Lay persons can be cremated according to Hindu law and priests can be buried or cremated depending upon which tradition one wishes to follow. In the Caribbean and across North America, Kabir Panthis may opt for burning or burial.
Modern Kabir Panthis do not seem to be different from orthodox Vaishanavites; they worship the idol of Kabir, wear sacred thread and sandalwood paste.

Kabir Panthis observe sanctity and purity in their daily lives and behavior. The foundation of their belief and practice are 

 Dharma, or "the natural Law of life",
 Satya, or "The primordial and eternal truth",
 Ahimsa, or "Non-violence towards all beings through word and deed",
 Bhakti, or "Devotional love for god and a higher spiritual reality",
 Sraddha, or "Faith and unswerving loyalty",
 Asteya, or "Neither hoarding nor coveting",
 Kshama, or "Forgiveness and patience",
 Daya, or "Compassion, mercy, and conquering feelings of cruelty and insensitivity towards all beings",
 Shaucha or "Purity in body, mind and speech", 
 Aparigraha, or "Limiting possessions to what is necessary and being non-materialistic", 
 Anekantvada, or "Acceptance of different beliefs and the multiplicity of viewpoints", 
 Vishwa Bandhutva, or "The universal brotherhood of all beings" and 
 Atma Gyan or "The awareness of ones true self, which is no different from the one true reality which pervades in everyone, thus making everyone the one and only true reality". 

These basic set of guidelines gives Kabir Panthis an all-encompassing formula for Love, Humility, Compassion and Unity. A Kabir Panthi lay person is called a Bhakta and priests are addressed with the honorific title of Mahant. Spiritual leaders are called Acharya or Guru. Monks who are more ascetic in nature, who do not marry and engage in more severe spiritual pursuits while never living in one place, constantly moving from monastery to monastery are called Brahmachari Sadhus, whereas those monks who do marry, have children and live a more relaxed spiritual life are Grihasta Sadhus. Similarly, women who have chosen to be Nuns are called Sadhvis.  God is called by an infinite array of names but some of the more common names are "Satya Purush", "Soham Sadguru", "Adi Guru,  Param Satyeshwar", or simply "Sadguru Kabir Saheb". During their religious ceremonies Kabir Panthis sing the songs, bhajans and Sakhis of Kabir to the music of cymbals, drums and other Indian instruments. The Guru recites various prayers and Mantras, all of which remind devotees to remember God in all that they do.

One's mind and body must be kept pure by contemplation and avoiding gross and complicated behaviour. Such practice will allow one to attain salvation while living no matter what ones religion or other personal endeavour may be. A mark of initiation into the Kabir Panth is given in the form of a Kanthi Mala. It is a necklace made from the sacred Tulsi beads. It is also made out of holy Rudraksha beads and can also be made using yagyopaveet string with just one large Tulsi or Rudraksha bead. It is worn by choice and is typically given to one who has committed to avoiding lust, anger, greed, attachment to perishable things, and ego. Sahaja Yoga involves remembering God by repeating Satyanaam. Kabir Panthis believe in simplicity of life; simple food, clothing and belongings. One should only acquire what is needed for sustenance. Kabir Panthis are strictly vegetarian and avoid the use of alcohol and tobacco.

Separate organizations have formed over the years. One of the largest groups of Kabir Panthis outside India is in Trinidad and Tobago: three smaller active groups exist in Guyana, Suriname and also in Canada. The Kabir Panth Association in Trinidad and Tobago operates two primary schools and was one of the first religious denominational schools founded in the region. Recently, other groups have been formed in Trinidad and Tobago [like Kabir Chaura Math, Satya Kabir Nidhi], each with their own emphasis on the teachings of Kabir Saheb and with their own affiliations in Trinidad and Tobago, Bhaarat and elsewhere in the World.

Scriptures

The Bijak
The most sacred books of the Kabir Panth sect are the Bijak, many passages from which are presented in the Guru Granth Sahib and the Anurag Sagar. In a blunt and uncompromising style, the Bijak exhorts its readers to shed their delusions, pretensions, and orthodoxies in favor of a direct experience of truth. It satirizes hypocrisy, greed, and violence, especially among the religious.

The Bijak includes three main sections (called Ramainī, Shabda and Sākhī) and a fourth section containing miscellaneous folksongs. Most of Kabir's material has been popularized through the song form known as Shabda (or pada) and through the aphoristic two-line sākhī (or doha) that serves throughout north India as a vehicle for popular wisdom. In the Anurag Sagar, the story of creation is told to Dharamdas (one of Kabir's disciples), and the Maan Sarowar is another collection of teachings of Kabir from the Dharamdasi branch of the Kabir panth.

Other Scriptures
 Anuraag Saagar
 Kabir Baani
 Kabir Granthaawalee
 Saakhi Granth
 Kabir Saagar
Kabir Amrit Sandesh
Sandhyaa Paath
Guru Mahimaa

Pictures of Kabir

Major centres
The centres of major branches of Kabir Panthis include:

 Kabir Dharamnagar Damakheda seat at Baloda Bazar-Bhatapara district on Raipur - Bilaspur, Chhattisgarh Highway (Dharamdas saheb ji lineage branch);
 Kabir Chaura based in Varanasi with a branch at Maghar;
 Biddupur seat founded by Jagu Sahib ;
 Dhanuati (Chhapra, Bihar) founded by Bhagvan Sahib, the scribe of Bijak;
 Chhattisgarh seat at Kudurmal, founded by Muktamani Sahib (Vikram Samvat 1570-1630). They belong to the line of Dharmadaas Saaheb;
Kabir Parakh Sansthan, Preetam Nagar, Allahabad, Uttar Pradesh. Founded by Sri Abhilash Das on 1978.

References

Hindu denominations
Vaishnava sects
Bhakti-era Hindu sects
Nirguna worship traditions
Religious pluralism
Sant Mat
Social groups of Uttar Pradesh
Universalism
15th-century establishments in India